Steve King (born September 4, 1952 in Montreal) is a Canadian sprint canoeist who competed in the late 1970s. At the 1976 Summer Olympics in Montreal, he finished eighth in the K-2 1000 m event while being eliminated in the semifinals of the K-2 500 m event.

References
Sports-reference.com profile

1952 births
Canoeists from Montreal
Canadian male canoeists
Canoeists at the 1976 Summer Olympics
Living people
Olympic canoeists of Canada